Byrums raukar are a geological formation of a group of rauks (Swedish term for stacks) on the western shore in the north of Öland, Sweden (the island forming the Kalmar Strait with the Swedish mainland) near the village of Byrum. The area is about 3 hectares, is a Natural Monument III and a nature reserve since 1935.

References

External links

Byrums raukar Nature Reserve on protectedplanet.net

 

Baltic Klint
Nature reserves in Sweden
Öland
Limestone formations
Geology of Sweden
Stacks (geology)